The Wall Flower is a 1922 American silent romantic drama film directed by Rupert Hughes and starring Colleen Moore, Richard Dix, Gertrude Astor, Laura La Plante, and Tom Gallery. The film was released by Goldwyn Pictures in May 1922.

Plot
As described in a film magazine, Idalene Nobbin (Moore) attends a village dance but, due to the constant nagging of her mother (Stockbridge), she believes herself to be a constitutional wallflower. By great luck she gets a dance with college football star Roy Duncan (Gallery), although Roy has eyes for the village belle Prue Nickerson (La Plante). Phil Larrabee (Hughes), another suitor for Prue's hand, tells Roy that Prue's name is Idalene Nobbin, and Roy sends an invitation to attend a "prom" dance. Idalene and her mother appear at the dance, and Roy bribes his fellow students to fill Idalene's dance card. She overhears part of the bargaining and, hurt and humiliated, she rushes from the dance and stumbles in front of a passing automobile. With both legs broken, she is picked up by Pamela Shiel (Astor) and westerner Walt Breen (Dix). She confesses that she tried to kill herself, saying that she will never have a lover, a husband, home, or babies. Breen and Pamela decide to bring some sunshine into her life. After Idalene recovers, Pamela coaches her and dresses her in some gowns, and then gives a house party. The college cubs desert Prue for Idalene, but now she prefers the company of Breen, who then proposes and she accepts for a happy ending.

Cast
Colleen Moore as Idalene Nobbin
Richard Dix as Walt Breen
Gertrude Astor as Pamela Shiel
Laura La Plante as Prue Nickerson
Tom Gallery as Roy Duncan
Rush Hughes as Phil Larrabee
Dana Todd as Allen Lansing
Fanny Stockbridge as Mrs. Nobbin
Emily Rait as Mrs. Nickerson

Preservation
The film is now considered lost.

See also
Gertrude Astor filmography

References

External links

1922 romantic drama films
Goldwyn Pictures films
American romantic drama films
1922 films
American silent feature films
American black-and-white films
Lost American films
Films directed by Rupert Hughes
Films with screenplays by Rupert Hughes
1920s American films
Silent romantic drama films
Silent American drama films